Sarp Falls ( or ) is a waterfall at Sarpsborg in Viken, Norway.
It is the second largest waterfall in Europe by discharge, after the Rhine Falls.

This is the last waterfall on the Glomma River, which is the longest river in Norway. Sarp Falls has one of the greatest flows of any waterfall in Europe. Just above Sarp Falls is a road bridge with a vista point. There are also vista points on the east side of the falls.

River surfing 
Sarpebølgen (lit. the Sarp Wave) lies about 2-3 kilometers downstream from the Sarp Falls, and is popular among kayakers and experienced surfers. The Norwegian Cup in Freestyle Paddling has been arranged here. The wave is spectacular, since it is quite big in regards to river surfing. Experienced surfers have warned beginners from trying the wave, since there are strong currents which means one can easily be dragged far downstream. The wave appears when the flow rate is above 800-900 m3/s. It is said that the wave is well suited for surfing on a surfboard at a flow rate from 1250 m3/s and up, and very well at around 1700 m3/s. Glommens og Laagens Brukseierforening provide freely available flow measurements of the river flow online.

Average water flow and temperature

See also 
List of waterfalls by flow rate

References 

Landforms of Viken (county)
River surfing
Waterfalls of Norway